Lekárovce is a village and municipality in the Sobrance District in the Košice Region of east Slovakia.

History
In historical records the village was first mentioned in 1400. After World War II, the village was transferred to Slovakia from the Zakarpattia Oblast of the Ukrainian Soviet Socialist Republic in 1946.

Geography
The village lies at an altitude of 108 metres and covers an area of 12.269 km².
It has a population of about 1030 people. The Uh river splits the village in two parts.

Culture

There are currently two active folk groups in the village – men's Užan and women's Pajtaški. 
The village has a soccer pitch, a gym and it is also known for its tradition in firemen competitions.

References

External links
 
http://en.e-obce.sk/obec/lekarovce/lekarovce.html
http://www.obeclekarovce.szm.sk

Villages and municipalities in Sobrance District